Le Chat (French for "the cat") was a Belgian daily comic strip, created by Philippe Geluck and published in the newspaper Le Soir from March 22, 1983, until March 23, 2013.

During its run, it quickly became one of the bestselling Franco-Belgian comics series and the mascot of Le Soir. While virtually an icon in Wallonia, he is far less well known in Flanders.

Concept
Le Chat is an adult, human-sized obese, anthropomorphic cat who typically wears a suit. He always has the same physical expression. He often comes up with elaborate reasonings which lead to hilariously absurd conclusions e.g. by taking metaphors literally or by adding increasingly unlikely what-ifs to ordinary situations.

One page in length, it appeared weekly in the "Victor" supplement of Belgian newspaper Le Soir. For Le Chat's 20th anniversary in 2003, Le Soir allowed Geluck to illustrate that day's entire newspaper. An exhibition of Le Chat's history (and that of his creator), "Le Chat s'expose", was first held at the Autoworld Motor Museum in Brussels in Spring 2004, and has since toured Europe. In March–October 2006 it even appeared at Les Champs Libres in Rennes.

In popular culture

As part of the Brussels' Comic Book Route a wall in the Zuidlaan/Boulevard du Midi in Brussels was dedicated to "Le Chat" in August 1993.

On October 11, 2008, Le Chat received his own market place in Hotton in the Belgian province Luxembourg. A statue of him, sculpted by François Deboucq, was placed in the center, depicting him holding an umbrella which rains water down from inside.

On July 3, 2015, it was announced that "Le Chat" would receive his own museum.

Bibliography 
 Le Chat, 2001
 Le Retour du Chat, 2001
 La Vengeance du Chat, 2002
 Le Quatrième Chat, 2002
 Le Chat au Congo, 2003
 Ma langue au Chat, 2004
 Le Chat à Malibu, 2005
 Le Chat 1999,9999, 1999
 L'Avenir du Chat, 1999	
 Le Chat est content, 2000
 L'Affaire le Chat, 2001 (Available in English as "The Cat's travels" in 2010)	
 Et vous, chat va ?, 2003
 Le Chat a encore frappé, 2005
 La Marque du Chat, 2007
 Une Vie de Chat, 2008
 Le Chat, Acte XVI, 2010
 Le Meilleur du Chat, 1994 (Available in English as "God save the Cat" in 2008)
 L'Excellent du Chat, 1996
 Le Succulent du Chat, 1999
 Entrechats, 1999
 Le Top du Chat, 2009
 La Rumba du Chat, 2019
 Le Chat est parmi nous, 2020

Sources

External links
 Philippe Geluck's website

Belgian comic strips
Bandes dessinées
Belgian comics characters
Fictional cats
Anthropomorphic cats
Comics about cats
1983 comics debuts
2013 comics endings
Comics characters introduced in 1983
Mascots introduced in 1983
Gag cartoon comics
Gag-a-day comics
Satirical comics
Fictional Belgian people
Magazine mascots
Male characters in comics
Male characters in advertising